The Fish Museum & Biodiversity Centre (FMBC) is located in Mymensingh, Bangladesh, in a space provided by Bangladesh Agricultural University. FMBC is one of the largest such centres in South East Asia given the size and diversity of its exhibits and collections.. The centre was established in 2009 and developed in partnership with Stirling University. Its goal is to encourage sustainable fishing.

Objectives
The objective of the FMBC is to create an educational centre using interactive exhibits that focuses on Bangladesh's rich cultural history of fish and in raising local and international awareness of the need to change fishing practices to conserve and ensure the sustainability of Bangladesh's aquatic fauna. FMBC hopes to achieve this through inspiring educational exhibits, by maintaining and developing scientific collections for display and by fostering links with other museums and research centres internationally.

Exhibits
A total  of 265 freshwater fish species were recorded from Bangladesh. Among them, 230 species has been preserved and displayed in FMBC. The museum already boasts an impressive collection of riverine species from Bangladesh. Five rooms have already been renovated and include exhibits on extinct fossil and contemporary species, interactive exhibits and a media room.

Further exhibits are planned and the museum staff are working to secure supporting funds and further specimens for exhibiting. In future, the museum will include interactive public aquaria and bespoke systems for research purposes for conservation-based initiatives. It is intended that research facilities will include aquaria for maintaining large and small indigenous fish species, a cryogenic fish gene bank and DNA collections.

Visiting hour
The FMBC can be visited with prior contact on every Friday and Saturday (10.00-12.00 morning and 14.00 – 17.00 afternoon).

References

External links
 Stirling University: "Institute of Aquaculture: teaching the poorest people in Bangladesh", 17 January 2011. Retrieved 19 December 2016.

Fish conservation organizations
Museums in Bangladesh
Fisheries conservation organizations
Mymensingh
Fishing in Bangladesh
Bangladesh Agricultural University